Alejandro Sánchez may refer to:

 Alejandro Sánchez (baseball) (born 1959), Dominican baseball outfielder
 Alejandro Sánchez (athlete) (born 1949), Mexican hurdler
 Alejandro Sánchez (footballer, born 1970), Spanish footballer
 Alejandro Sánchez (footballer, born 1986), Argentine footballer
 Alejandro Sánchez Palomero (born 1986), Spanish swimmer

See also
 Alex Sánchez (disambiguation)